The biogeographic regions of Europe are biogeographic regions defined by the European Environment Agency.
They were initially limited to the European Union member states, but later extended to cover all of Europe west of the Urals, including all of Turkey.
The map of biogeographic regions is deliberately simplified and ignores local anomalies.
It is intended primarily as a framework for coordinating and reporting overall results of conservation efforts.

Berne Convention and Habitats Directive

The Habitats Directive of 21 May 1992 on the conservation of natural habitats and of wild fauna and flora is a key component of the European conservation policy.
It established the European Union's Natura 2000 network of protected areas.
Within the European Union, the Habitats Directive implements the 1 June 1982 Berne Convention on the Conservation of European Wildlife and Natural Habitats of the Council of Europe.
The Habitats Directive has a smaller geographical scope than the Berne Convention but stronger enforcement mechanisms.

The challenges to habitats and species vary across Europe due to differences in climate, topography, soil conditions and so on, but the problems and solutions may be similar between neighboring countries, which may benefit from coordinating conservation efforts for sites within the same biogeographical region.
Annex III of the Habitats Directive discusses a 2-stage approach to prioritizing conservation:
In Stage 1 each member country assesses the relative importance of sites in their country for habitats and species based on criteria defined in the Habitats Directive.
Stage 2 assesses the member country sites at a European Community level. It considers the national value of the site, its size and biodiversity, whether it is part of a continuous ecosystem on both sides of a frontier between member states, and its global ecological importance for its biogeographical region.  All sites identified by the Member States that have priority natural habitats or species  are considered Sites of Community Importance.

History

Alfred Russel Wallace made an early classification of the world's biogeographical regions and subregions in 1876.
He placed Europe in the Palaearctic Region (today called the Palearctic realm), divided between the North Europe and Mediterranean subregions.
The subregions roughly matched Augustin Pyramus de Candolle's botanical regions, and were basically an attempt to define areas of strongly related endemism.

The modern Biogeographical Regions Map of Europe was developed for use by the European Union member countries in applying the criteria of the Habitats Directive, Annex III, Stage 2: "... to assess the community importance and to select from the national lists the sites which will become Special Areas for Conservation." 
The proposed sites within each of the biogeographical regions are evaluated against the criteria given in Annex III.

The original Habitats Directive of 21 May 1992 identified five biogeographical regions: Alpine, Atlantic, Continental, Macaronesian and Mediterranean. 
These provide a geographical framework for creating a draft list of Sites of Community Importance from the lists provided by the member states.
The Boreal region was added in 1995 when Austria, Finland and Sweden joined the European Union.

In 1996 the Standing Committee of the Berne Convention decided to set up the Emerald network of Areas of Special Conservation Interest (ASCI’s).
In 1998 the Standing Committee of the Berne Convention made it clear that for European Union member states the Emerald sites were the European Union's Natura 2000 network sites.
The map of Biogeographical Regions therefore had to be expanded to cover all of Europe, not just the European Union.
Five more biogeographical regions were added: Anatolian, Arctic, Black Sea, Pannonian and Steppic.
The revised Biogeographical Regions map for the Pan-European area was approved by the Standing Committee of the Bern Convention in November 2001.

Approach

The European Agency for Environmental Protection has taken a pragmatic approach to defining biogeographic regions in Europe.
Basic principles included to limit the number of regions to those already identified in the Habitats Directive, with no "sub-classes", and to produce only a small scale map in which small islands of different regions or of no defined region would be included in the surrounding major region.
For example, Turkey is divided into the Mediterranean, Black Sea and Anatolian biogeographic regions, but it could be argued that parts of that country belong to the Alpine region.
For the sake of simplicity, national borders were sometimes taken as the borders between regions.
Paper-based maps were used for some areas, so some of the boundaries are imprecise.

Regions
The biogeographical regions and the main threats to their biodiversity as of 2003 are:

Notes

Sources

Biogeography
Environment of Europe